Gurichi (also Romanized as Gūrīchī; also known as Gūrīchī Bālā) is a village in Jakdan Rural District, in the Central District of Bashagard County, Hormozgan Province, Iran. At the 2006 census, its population was 480, in 118 families.

References 

Populated places in Bashagard County